Feickert is a surname of German origin. Notable people with the surname include:

Dennis Feickert (born 1948), American politician
Lillian Feickert (1877–1945), American suffragette, political organizer, and political candidate

References

Surnames of German origin